Brian D. Loader (born 1958) is currently Co-Director of the Centre for Political Youth Culture and Communication (CPAC) at the University of York, UK. Brian joined the Department of Sociology at York in January 2006 to pursue his scholarly interests into digital media communication and democratic governance. His overarching interest is in new media communications technologies, and the social, political and economic factors shaping their development and diffusion, and their implications for social, economic, political and cultural change. He has published widely in these areas and is the founding Editor of the international journal Information, Communication and Society whose aim and scope is to critically explore these issues in depth.

Brian's interest  in the transforming capacities of Internet began in the mid-1990s primarily as a critical response to two discourses that continue to frame discussions about the socio-political influence of new media technologies to this day.  The first, addressed in his book The Governance of Cyberspace (1997), highlighted and criticised the ‘cyber-libertarian’ portrayals of the Internet as emancipatory spaces divorced from the ‘real world’ of power, place, history and political economy. The second, and related concern, outlined in The Cyberspace Divide (1998) was the crucial issue of what impact the Internet would have upon different social groups. These two themes have continued to shape his research interest in how social relations of power are increasingly mediated through information and communication technologies.

Community informatics

In 1996 he was responsible for establishing and directing the Community Informatics Research and Applications Unit (CIRA) which attempted to explore the potential of new media for shaping the development, sustainability and even regeneration of community relations. What he described as community informatics was from the outset concerned with the relationship between geographical places where people lived, worked and socialized and the networked spaces provided by the Internet. Publications such as Community Informatics: Shaping Computer-Mediated Social Networks (2001) and Challenging the Digital Divide? A literature Review of Community Informatics Initiatives (2004) documented both the potential of new media for community development and also the wider role it played in the fragmentation and individualization of local social relations. Active research projects, including Trimdon Digital Village informed UK policy debates about bridging the digital divide. Brian continues to be a member of the editorial board for the Journal of Community Informatics.

During his time at CIRA Brian together with colleagues at Teesside and worldwide attempted to explore the potential of new media for shaping the development, sustainability and even regeneration of community relations. What they described as community informatics was from the outset concerned with the relationship between geographical places where people lived, worked and socialized and the networked spaces provided by the Internet.

Young citizens

On arriving at York Brian focused upon the potential of social media to influence  the political and civic engagement of young citizens. First, by hosting a small symposium which was later published in an edited collection as Young Citizens In the Digital Age (2007) and then by establishing in partnership with Lance Bennett a study group called Networking Young Citizens under the auspices of the World Universities Network. Together with Ariadne Vromen and Mike Xenos, he is undertaking a three country comparative study of the potential influence of social media upon the participatory culture of young citizens entitled The Civic Network which is funded by the Spencer Foundation.

Recent work

Research interest in the broader impact of new media upon democratic governance began with the publication of Digital Democracy: Discourse and Decision-Making in the Information Age (1999) following the first of several conferences devoted to this issue. The use of new media by social movements was first explored in Cyberprotest: New Media, Citizens and Social Movements (2004) with other European colleagues collaborating on a COST programme. Most recently, it was the focus of a conference on Networking Democracy held in Cluj, Romania where these themes were further developed in Social Media and Democracy: social media innovations in participatory politics (2012).

The potential for new media to shape practices of social care both organisationally and individually has been a longstanding research area. He has been particularly interested in the use of ICTs in re-structuring health and social care organizations and professional practices. With colleagues on an ESRC funded project on Virtual Community Care the use of the Internet as a potential means of online social support revealed the effectiveness of social networking amongst informed participants for facilitating social support. It further foregrounded how such technologies could transform relations between professionals and clients. Digital Welfare for the Third Age (2009) developed these ideas on the basis of a UK Department of Health funded project into electronic service delivery for older people.

Brian’s wider interest in social media and the Internet is facilitated through his editorship of the international journal Information, Communication & Society (iCS). Included in the prestigious Thompson Reuters Social Science Citation Index iCS is published in twelve issues annually. This comprises several special issues including the best papers from both the annual conference of the Association of Internet Researchers and the American Sociological Association section on Communication and Information Technologies. Under Brian’s editorship iCS also hosts regular conferences around the world on a range of topics related to the social, cultural, political and economic influence of new media communications technologies. The most recent were A Decade in Internet Time at Balliol College, Oxford, and at York on The Co-Production of Knowledge.

Books

The Networked Young Citizen: social media, political participation and civic engagement, (edited with Ariadne Vromen and Mike Xenos), New York: Routledge. (2014)

Social Media and Democracy:  social media innovations in participatory politics, (edited with Dan Mercea) London: Routledge. (2012)

Digital Welfare for the Third Age: Health and Social Care Informatics for Older People, (edited with Mike Hardey and Leigh Keeble) London: Routledge. (2009)

Young Citizens in the Digital Age: Political Engagement, Young People and New Media, London: Routledge.  (ed.) (2007)

Articles

Manning, N, Penfold-Mounce, R., Loader, B.D., Vromen, A. and Xenos, M. ‘Politicians, Celebrities and Social Media: A case of informalization?’, Journal of Youth Studies, published online 25 July 2016.

Mercea, D., Iannelli, L. and Loader, B.D. (2016) ‘Protest Communication Ecologies’, Information, Communication & Society, DOI: 10.1080/1369118X.2015.1109701

Qiu, J. and Loader, B.D. (2016) ‘Understanding Digital Cultures’, Information, Communication & Society, 19:1, DOI: 10.1080/1369118X.2015.1094114

Vromen, A., Loader, B.D., Xenos, M. and Bailo, F. (2016) ‘Everyday-making through Facebook engagement: Young citizens’ political interactions in Australia, UK and USA’, Political Studies, 64:3, pp. 513-533.

Vromen, A., Loader, B.D. & Xenos, M. ‘Beyond Lifestyle Politics in a time of crisis?: comparing young people’s issue agendas and views on inequality’, (2016) Policy Studies, 36:6, https://dx.doi.org/10.1080/01442872.2015.1095283 

Loader, B.D., Vromen, A., & Xenos, M. (2016) ‘Performing for the young networked citizen?: celebrity politics, social networking and the political engagement of young people. (with Vromen, A. and Xenos, M.) Media, Culture & Society, 28:3, 400-419. DOI: 101177/0163443715608261

‘Campus politics, student societies and social media’ (with Vromen, A., Xenos, M.A., Steel, H. & Bergum, S.) (2015) The Sociological Review 63:4, 820-839, DOI: 10.1111/1467-954X.00251

References

1958 births
Living people
Academics of the University of York